The Bolshaya Pera (also Большая Пёра Bolshaya Pyora) is a river in Amur Oblast, Russia. It is a right tributary of the Zeya. It begins on the Amur–Zeya Plain northwest of the mountains it flows through the town of Shimanovsk and the Vostochny Cosmodrome. It flows into a branch of the Zeya near Svobodny. Its main tributaries are Dzhatva (57 km) and Malaya Pera (88 km) to the right and Ora (55 km) to the left.

References

Rivers of Amur Oblast